Nueil-sur-Layon (literally Nueil on Layon) is a former commune in the Maine-et-Loire department in western France. On 1 January 2016, it was merged into the new commune of Lys-Haut-Layon.

Geography
The village lies on the left bank of the Layon, which flows northeastward through the southern part of the commune.

See also
Communes of the Maine-et-Loire department

References

Nueilsurlayon